Portalegre District is located in the east of Portugal. The district capital is the city of Portalegre.

As of 2021, it is the least populous district of Portugal.

Municipalities
The district is composed of 15 municipalities:

 Alter do Chão
 Arronches
 Avis
 Campo Maior
 Castelo de Vide
 Crato
 Elvas
 Fronteira
 Gavião
 Marvão
 Monforte
 Nisa
 Ponte de Sor
 Portalegre
 Sousel

Summary of votes and seats won 1976-2022

|- class="unsortable"
!rowspan=2|Parties!!%!!S!!%!!S!!%!!S!!%!!S!!%!!S!!%!!S!!%!!S!!%!!S!!%!!S!!%!!S!!%!!S!!%!!S!!%!!S!!%!!S!!%!!S!!%!!S
|- class="unsortable" align="center"
!colspan=2 | 1976
!colspan=2 | 1979
!colspan=2 | 1980
!colspan=2 | 1983
!colspan=2 | 1985
!colspan=2 | 1987
!colspan=2 | 1991
!colspan=2 | 1995
!colspan=2 | 1999
!colspan=2 | 2002
!colspan=2 | 2005
!colspan=2 | 2009
!colspan=2 | 2011
!colspan=2 | 2015
!colspan=2 | 2019
!colspan=2 | 2022
|-
| align="left"| PS || style="background:#FF66FF;"|41.9 || style="background:#FF66FF;"|3 || 29.8 || 1 ||32.4 || 1 || style="background:#FF66FF;"|38.5 || style="background:#FF66FF;"|2 || 23.7 || 1 || 25.1 || 1 || 33.5 || 1 || style="background:#FF66FF;"|50.5 || style="background:#FF66FF;"|2  || style="background:#FF66FF;"|51.2 || style="background:#FF66FF;"|2 || style="background:#FF66FF;"|45.3 || style="background:#FF66FF;"|2 || style="background:#FF66FF;"|54.9 || style="background:#FF66FF;"|2 || style="background:#FF66FF;"|38.3 || style="background:#FF66FF;"|1 || 32.4 || 1 || style="background:#FF66FF;"|42.4 || style="background:#FF66FF;"|1 || style="background:#FF66FF;"|44.7 || style="background:#FF66FF;"|2 || style="background:#FF66FF;"|47.2 || style="background:#FF66FF;"|2
|-
| align="left"| PSD || 10.1 ||  || align=center colspan=4|In AD || 19.1 || 1 || 20.9 || 1 || style="background:#FF9900;"|37.4 || style="background:#FF9900;"|1 || style="background:#FF9900;"|38.9 || style="background:#FF9900;"|2 || 23.4 || 1 || 22.5|| 1 || 30.6 || 1 || 20.2 ||  || 23.8 || 1 || style="background:#FF9900;"|32.5 || style="background:#FF9900;"|1 || align=center colspan=2|In PàF || 20.1 ||  || 23.2 || 
|-
| align="left"| PCP/APU/CDU || 22.0 || 1 || 29.4|| 1 || 26.1 || 1 || 28.7 || 1 || style="background:red;"|25.2 || style="background:red;"|1 || 20.9 || 1 || 15.2 ||  || 14.0 ||  || 15.0 ||  || 12.4 ||  || 12.1 ||  || 12.9 ||  || 12.8 ||  || 12.2 ||  || 8.1 ||  || 7.6 || 
|-
| align="left"| AD || colspan=2| || style="background:#00FFFF;"|32.1 || style="background:#00FFFF;"|2 || style="background:#00FFFF;"|33.4 || style="background:#00FFFF;"|2 || colspan=26|
|-
| align="left"| PàF || colspan=26| || 27.6 || 1 || colspan=4|
|-
! Total seats || colspan=8|4 || colspan=12|3 || colspan=12|2
|-
! colspan=33|Source: Comissão Nacional de Eleições
|}

 
Districts of Portugal
District